Doublures are ornamental linings on the inside of a book. Doublures are protected from wear, compared to the outside of a book, and thus offer bookbinders scope for elaborate decoration.

The 15th-century Islamic doublures strongly influenced the doublures in Western Europe.

The term doublure is of French origin. Tooled doublures are found in French bookbinding of the seventeenth century: in particular, they are associated with the books of the Jansenist sect, which were extremely simple on the outside, while they had gilding on the doublure.  One of the bookbinders known for his Jansenist-style bindings was Luc-Antoine Boyet, binder to Louis XIV. The term Jansenist is also applied to bindings in this style of a much later date.

The British bookbinder G.T. Bagguley patented a process for tooling in colours called the "Sutherland binding" which was principally employed on doublures. Bagguley, who was librarian to the Duke and Duchess of Sutherland, named the process after the duchess.

References 

Bookbinding